The Knockout Stage of the 2000 Fed Cup Europe/Africa Zone Group I was the final stage of the Zonal Competition involving teams from Europe and Africa. Those that qualified for this stage placed first in their respective pools.

The four teams were then randomly drawn into a two-stage knockout tournament, with the winner advancing to the World Group Play-offs next year.

Draw

Semifinals

Netherlands vs. Israel

Belarus vs. Hungary

Final

Netherlands vs. Hungary

See also
Fed Cup structure

References

External links
 Fed Cup website

2000 Fed Cup Europe/Africa Zone